Dennis Hay (born 5 October 1940) is a former Scottish field hockey player, who competed for Great Britain at the 1972 Summer Olympics. Later he became a coach, leading the GB Women's Team to the bronze medal at the 1992 Summer Olympics in Barcelona, Spain, after having finished in fourth place at the 1988 Summer Olympics.

He is widely regarded as the father of hockey at Edinburgh University Men's Hockey Club, at the University of Edinburgh.

In collaboration with sprints coach Stuart Dempster Dennis assisted writing "101 Youth Hockey Drills" (A+C Black, London) in 2008 with a revised version in 2010. The book provides hockey drills based on movement patterns relating to hockey.

References

External links
 
 
 Dennis Hay at the British Olympic Committee 

1940 births
Living people
British male field hockey players
Scottish male field hockey players
Scottish field hockey coaches
Olympic field hockey players of Great Britain
Field hockey players at the 1972 Summer Olympics
Place of birth missing (living people)